İsmail Güldüren (born January 1, 1979 in İnegöl, Bursa Province) is a Turkish football manager and former player who was most recently manager of İnegölspor.

Career
Güldüren currently plays for Giresunspor as a secondary captain next to Emrah Eren. He previously played for Gençlerbirliği, Ankaraspor, Fenerbahçe, Bursaspor and Konyaspor. He plays left back and full back. Standing at 183 cm, he wears the number 3 jersey.

Honours 
Gençlerbirliği
Turkish Cup (1): 2001
Fenerbahçe
Süper Lig (1): 2003–04

References

External links 
internethaber.com
Profile at TFF.org
Coach profile at TFF
İsmail Güldüren at Footballdatabase

1979 births
Living people
People from İnegöl
Turkish footballers
Turkey under-21 international footballers
Fenerbahçe S.K. footballers
Gençlerbirliği S.K. footballers
Ankaraspor footballers
Bursaspor footballers
Konyaspor footballers
Giresunspor footballers
Süper Lig players
Turkey youth international footballers
Association football defenders